Stefan Ulm (born 21 December 1975) is a German sprint canoeist who competed from 1997 to 2004. Competing in two Summer Olympics, he won two silvers in the K-4 1000 m event (2000, 2004).

Ulm also won eight medals at the ICF Canoe Sprint World Championships with five golds (K-4 500 m: 1998, 1999; K-4 1000 m: 1997, 1998, 2001), two silvers (K-4 1000 m: 1999, 2002), and a bronze (K-4 1000 m: 2003).

References

 
 Kanu.de profile

External links
 

1975 births
Canoeists at the 2000 Summer Olympics
Canoeists at the 2004 Summer Olympics
German male canoeists
Living people
Olympic canoeists of Germany
Olympic silver medalists for Germany
Canoeists from Berlin
Olympic medalists in canoeing
ICF Canoe Sprint World Championships medalists in kayak
Medalists at the 2000 Summer Olympics
Medalists at the 2004 Summer Olympics